Svistovka is a rural locality (a selo) in Krasnensky District, Belgorod Oblast, Russia. The population was 124 as of 2010. There are 2 streets.

Geography 
Svistovka is located 10 km northeast of Krasnoye (the district's administrative centre) by road. Kiselevka is the nearest rural locality.

References 

Rural localities in Krasnensky District